Thomas Leysen (born 1960) is a Belgian entrepreneur who graduated from the Katholieke Universiteit Leuven with a degree in law.

Career
Leysen spent a large part of his career at Umicore (formerly Union Minière), which was transformed under his leadership from a metals producer to a materials technology group with leading positions in battery materials, automotive catalysts and precious metals recycling. He was CEO of the company until 2008, after which he became chairman of the board.

Leysen was chairman of the Federation of Enterprises in Belgium (FEB) between 2008 and 2011.

Between 2011 and 2020, Leysen has been chairman of the board of KBC Group, a banking and insurance group with activities mainly in Belgium, Central Europe and Ireland.

Leysen is also the chairman and a large shareholder of Mediahuis, a media company and leading publisher of newspapers in Belgium, The Netherlands, Ireland, Luxembourg and Germany (De Standaard, De Telegraaf, NRC Handelsblad, Irish Independent, among other publications). In addition, he is chairman of the Belgian Corporate Governance Commission. He has long been committed to the promotion of sustainability development, and was the founding chair of The Shift, a coalition of businesses and non-governmental organisations in Belgium.

Other activities

Corporate boards
 Toyota, member of the global advisory board
 Atlas Copco,member of the board

Non-profit organizations
 Bilderberg Group, member of the steering committee
 European Round Table of Industrialists (ERT), member
 Friends of Europe, member of the board of trustees
 King Baudouin Foundation, chairman (2016 till 2021)
 Flemish Heritage Council, chairman
 Rubenianum Fund, chairman
 Trilateral Commission, member of the European Group
 Federation of Belgian Enterprises (VBO), chairman (2008–2011)

Sources
 Board of Directors (Umicore)

References

External links

1960 births
Living people
Flemish businesspeople
Belgian newspaper publishers (people)
KU Leuven alumni
Members of the Steering Committee of the Bilderberg Group